The Fisheries Act 1996 is a New Zealand Act of Parliament. It is divided into five areas: recreational, customary, environmental, commercial and international fishing. It is currently administered by the Ministry of Primary Industries, but was originally administered by the Overseas Investment Commission and the Ministry of Fisheries. The Act mostly deals with the minimum size requirements and maximum quantity limit for each species of fish and seafood before they can be caught for selling or consumption.

There are regular prosecutions under the act for the taking of paua.

See also
Fisheries Act
Fishing industry in New Zealand

References

External links
Text of the Act

Statutes of New Zealand
Fishing in New Zealand
1996 in New Zealand law
Fisheries law